National Review may refer to:

National Review (founded 1955), American biweekly contemporary political magazine based in New York City
National Review (London) (1883–1960), called National and English Review (1950–1960), a defunct London publication founded in 1883
National Review (1855) (1855–1864), a defunct London publication founded in 1855

See also 
 National Review Board (founded 2002), the "National Review Board for the Protection of Children and Young People" created by American Bishops
 National Board of Review (founded 1909), the USA "National Board of Review of Motion Pictures"